Anchorage Capital Group (Anchorage) is an American hedge fund based in New York City. The firm is known as one of the world's most prominent vulture funds, funds that invest in distressed securities.

Background 

Anchorage was founded in 2003 by Kevin Ulrich and Tony Davis. Both of them were previously working in the distressed debt business of Goldman Sachs. The firm received $100 million in seed money from Reservoir Capital Group. Later on Davis, left the firm to start a new one named Inherent Group which focused on ESG investments.

In December 2021, Anchorage announced it would close its $7.4 billion credit flagship fund (ACP Capital) due to lackluster returns and difficulties in markets such as distressed securities.  The firm would move on to focus more on investments related to structured finance like collateralized loan obligations as well as private credit.

At the same time, co-founder Ulrich also announced he would be stepping down from his role as CEO to move to a new role as Chairman. One of the potential factors that led to this apart from the firm's recent performance was the fact that in 2019, Ulrich was sued by a woman accusing him of sexual assault in a Manhattan hotel. The complaint was withdrawn later after Ulrich settled with the accuser, but the firm's clients were displeased by the firm's failure to disclose the allegations after they appeared on public record.
Anchorage is headquartered in New York City and has an additional office in London.

Although Anchorage mainly invests in distressed securities such as securities of  Eir and New Look, in recent years it has been involved in funding startups and early stage companies such as Brat TV, Eko and SingleStore.

Notable deals

MGM Studios 
One of the most notable deals that Anchorage was involved in was investing $500 million in MGM Studios in 2010 to bring it out of bankruptcy. Ulrich joined its board in 2010 and became chairman in 2017. During the period Anchorage held MGM Studios, it had to fight off efforts by activist shareholder, Carl Icahn to take control of MGM studios. Gary Barber was brought in by Ulrich to become CEO in 2010 but a rift between the two grew. On October 2017, Barber received a contract renewal for 5 years until 2022. But only several months later, he was fired and given a $260 million severance package. He was never replaced and in the interim, the company was led by the newly formed "Office of the CEO".  In 2021, MGM studios was sold to Amazon for $8.45 billion which resulted in a $2 billion profit for Anchorage.

J.Crew 
On May 4, 2020, J.Crew announced that it would apply for bankruptcy protection amidst the COVID-19 pandemic. On September 11, 2020, it was announced that J.Crew had exited bankruptcy after Anchorage invested in it.

Disputes 

In 2013, BNP Paribas sued Anchorage Capital after it agreed to purchase $60 million worth of debt from Irish Bank Resolution Corporation and then failed to pay. The court ruled in favour of BNP Paribas.

References

External links
 

2003 establishments in New York City
Financial services companies established in 2003
Hedge fund firms in New York City
Investment management companies of the United States
Privately held companies based in New York City